Siachoque is a town and municipality in the Central Boyacá Province, part of the Colombian department of Boyacá. It borders Toca in the north, Rondón and Viracachá in the south, in the east Toca, Pesca and Rondón and in the west Soracá and Chivatá.

Etymology 
The name Siachoque comes from the Chibcha language of the Muisca people who inhabited the central highlands of present-day Colombia before the Spanish conquest. It is composed of the words Si; "here", a; "from, taste, smell", chó; "good" and que; "vigorous fortress", translating as "place of good smells and strong and vigorous cultures" or "Land of the vigorous taste".

History 
Siachoque was part of the loose Muisca Confederation, the former country in the Colombian Andes and the cacique of Siachoque was loyal to the zaque of Hunza. At the defeat of the latter the municipality became part of the New Kingdom of Granada and modern Siachoque was founded on August 2, 1556 by friar Jerónimo de Peralta.

Economy 
Main economical activities in Siachoque are agriculture; potatoes, Solanum phureja (papa criolla), maize, oat, barley and wheat, livestock farming and processing of meat and dairy products.

Gallery

References 

Municipalities of Boyacá Department
Populated places established in 1556
1556 establishments in the Spanish Empire
Muisca Confederation
Muysccubun